Gavigan is an Irish surname that claims its origins with different local chieftains depending upon the research performed.

Etymology
 From County Mayo, Ireland, a local Irish chieftain called "Gabhadhan", the old Gaelic might have been something like, when the grammatical séimhiú is represented by the letter "h", "Ó Gáibhtheacháin". This might be translated to signify "the Anxious One".
 From "Mag Eachagáin" (son of Eachagán, in turn a diminutive of the personal name Eachadh).
 From the southern O'Neill or (as written in Irish) Uí Néill clan of Geoghegan, "Gabhachan" from north Leinster and Ulster, cattle grazers on pasture lands. "Gabha" might signify or mean a blacksmith.

The motto upon the Gavigan family coat of arms may be translated to mean Always ready to serve my king and country.

Notable people with the name 
 Joseph A. Gavagan (1892–1968), American politician
 Martin Gavigan, Irish former Gaelic footballer
 Michelle Gavagan (born 1990), environmentalist and beauty queen from the Philippines
 Peter Gavigan (1897–1977), Scottish footballer
 Annette McGavigan (1957–1971), casualty of the Troubles
 Ruth McGavigan (born 1976), Scottish mountain biker
 Jim Gaffigan (born 1966), American comedian

References

External links
 About the name O'Neill
 Boxer Tommy Gavigan
 Southern Uí Néill

Surnames
Surnames of Irish origin
Irish families